Labdane is a natural bicyclic diterpene.  It forms the structural core for a wide variety of natural products collectively known as labdanes or labdane diterpenes.  The labdanes were so named because the first members of the class were originally obtained from labdanum, a resin derived from the gum rockrose.

A variety of biological activities have been determined for labdane diterpenes including antibacterial, antifungal, antiprotozoal, and anti-inflammatory activities.

Example labdane derivatives
 Forskolin
 Galanolactone
 Isocupressic acid - is an abortifacient component of Cupressus macrocarpa.
Medigenin
Sclareol
 Stemodene

See also 
 Abietane

References

Diterpenes
Decalins